Richard C. Caster (born October 16, 1948) is an American former professional football player who was a wide receiver and tight end for thirteen seasons in the National Football League (NFL), primarily with the New York Jets. He was selected to the Pro Bowl after the 1972, 1974 and 1975 seasons. He played college football at Jackson State University. He became a member of Phi Beta Sigma fraternity while a student at Jackson State University. His son Max is a professional wrestler signed to All Elite Wrestling.

References

1948 births
Living people
American Conference Pro Bowl players
American football wide receivers
American football tight ends
Houston Oilers players
Jackson State Tigers football players
New York Jets players
New Orleans Saints players
Players of American football from Alabama
Sportspeople from Mobile, Alabama
Washington Redskins players